Partners Please is a 1932 British comedy film about an aristocrat who becomes a gigolo. It was shot at Cricklewood Studios as a quota quickie.

Cast
Pat Paterson as Angela Grittlewood
Tony Sympson as Archie Dawlish
Ronald Ward as Eric Hatington
Alice O'Day as Mrs. Grittlewood
Binnie Barnes as Billie
Frederick Moyes as Mr. Grittlewood
Tony De Lungo as Marano
Hal Gordon as Waiter
Ralph Truman as CID Man

References

Bibliography
 Chibnall, Steve. Quota Quickies: The Birth of the British 'B' Film. British Film Institute, 2007.
 Low, Rachael. Filmmaking in 1930s Britain. George Allen & Unwin, 1985.
 Wood, Linda. British Films, 1927-1939. British Film Institute, 1986.

External links
Partners Please at IMDb

1932 films
British comedy films
1932 comedy films
British black-and-white films
1930s British films
Quota quickies
Films shot at Cricklewood Studios
1930s English-language films